Michael Morgan (born 21 May 1936 in Ynyshir) is an English former first-class cricketer who played first-class cricket for Nottinghamshire from 1957 to 1961. Morgan was an off-spin bowler and tail-end batsman. His best figures were 6 for 50 against Middlesex in August 1959.

References

English cricketers
Nottinghamshire cricketers
1936 births
Living people
Sportspeople from Rhondda Cynon Taf